Shumig (also, Sumeg, Yurok: Suemeeg)  is a former Yurok settlement in Humboldt County, California. It was located at Patrick's Point, at an elevation of 236 feet (72 m).

References

Former settlements in Humboldt County, California
Former populated places in California
Yurok villages